Political demography is the study of the relationship between politics and population change. Population change is driven by classic demographic mechanisms – birth, death, age structure, and migration. 

However, in political demography, there is always scope for assimilation as well as boundary and identity change, which can redraw the boundaries of populations in a way that is not possible with biological populations. Typically, political-demographic projections can account for both demographic factors and transitions caused by social change. A notable leader in the area of sub-state population projection is the World Population Program of the International Institute of Applied Systems Analysis (IIASA) in Laxenburg, Austria. 

Some of the issues which are studied in the context of political demography are: surges of young people in the developing world, significantly increasing aging in the developed world, and the impact of increasing urbanization. Political demographers study issues like population growth in a political context. A population's growth is impacted by the relative balance of variables like mortality, fertility and immigration. 

Many of the present world's most powerful nations are aging quickly, largely as a result of major decreases in fertility rates and major increases in life expectancies. As the labor pools in these nations shrink, and spending on the elderly increases, their economies are likely to slow down. By 2050, the workforce in Japan and Russia is predicted to decrease by more than 30 percent, while the German workforce is expected to decline by 25 percent by that year. The governments of these countries have made financial commitments to the elderly in their populations which will consume huge percentages of their national GDP. For example, based on current numbers, more than 25% of the national GDPs of Japan, France and Germany will be consumed by these commitments by 2040.

Political demography and evolution
Differential reproductive success is the mechanism through which evolution takes place. For much of human history this occurred through migrations and wars of conquest, with disease and mortality through famine and war affecting the power of empires, tribes and city-states. Differential fertility also played a part, though typically reflected resource availability rather than cultural factors. Though culture has largely usurped this role, some claim that differential demography continues to affect cultural and political evolution.

Uneven transition, democratization and globalization
The demographic transition from the late eighteenth century onwards opened up the possibility that significant change could occur within and between political units. Though the writings of Polybius and Cicero in classical times bemoaned the low fertility of the patrician elite as against their more fecund barbarian competitors, differential fertility has probably only recently emerged as a central aspect of political demography. 

This has come about due to medical advances which have lowered infant mortality while conquest migrations have faded as a factor in world history. Differences in immunity levels to infectious diseases between populations also play no major role in our age of modern medicine and widespread exposure to a common disease pool. 

It is not so much the trajectory of demographic transition that counts as the fact that it has become more intense and uneven in the late twentieth century as it has spread into the developing world. Uneven transitions lend themselves to differential growth rates between contending groups. These changes are in turn, magnified by democratization, which entrenches majority rule and privileges the power of numbers in politics as never before.

Indeed, in many new democracies riven by ethnic and religious conflicts, elections are akin to censuses while groups seek to 'win the census'. Ethnic parties struggle to increase their constituencies through pronatalism ('wombfare'), oppose family planning, and contest census and election results.

Ethnic, national and civilizational conflict
One branch of political demography examines how differences in population growth between nation-states, religions, ethnic groups and civilizations affects the balance of power between these political actors. For instance, Ethiopia was projected to have a larger population than Russia in 2020, and while there were 3.5 Europeans per African in 1900, there will be four Africans for each European in 2050. Population has always counted for national power to some degree and it is unlikely that these changes will leave the world system unaffected. 

The same dynamic can be witnessed within countries due to differential ethnic population growth. Irish Catholics in Northern Ireland increased their share of the population through higher birthrates and the momentum of a youthful age structure from 35 to nearly 50 percent of the total between 1965 and 2011. Similar changes, also affected by in- and out-migration, have taken place in, amongst others, the United States (Hispanics), Israel-Palestine (Jews and Arabs), Kosovo (Albanians), Lebanon (Shia, with decline of Christians) and Nagorno-Karabakh (Armenians). 

In the US, the growth of Hispanics and Asians, and Hispanics' youthful age profile as against whites, has the potential to tilt more states away from the Republican Party. On the other hand, the fertility advantage of conservative over liberal white voters is significant and rising, thus the Republicans are poised to win a larger share of the white vote - especially over the very long run of 50 to 100 years. 

According to London-based scholar Eric Kaufmann, the high birth rates of religious fundamentalists as against seculars and moderates has contributed to an increase in religious fundamentalism and decrease of moderate religion within religious groups, as in Israel, the US and the Muslim Middle East. Kaufmann, armed with empirical from a number of countries, also posits that this will be further bolstered by the higher retention rates of religious fundamentalists, with individuals in religiously fundamentalist households less likely to become religiously non-observant than others. See also .

Age structure and politics

Youth bulges
A second avenue of inquiry considers age structures: be these 'youth bulges' or aging populations. Young populations are associated with a ratio of dependents to producers: a high proportion of the population under age 16 puts pressure on resources. A 'youth bulge' of those in the 16-30 bracket creates a different set of problems.

A large population of adolescents entering the labor force and electorate strains at the seams of the economy and polity, which were designed for smaller populations. This creates unemployment and alienation unless new opportunities are created quickly enough - in which case a 'demographic dividend' accrues because productive workers outweigh young and elderly dependents. Yet the 16-30 age range is associated with risk-taking, especially among males.

In general, youth bulges in developing countries are associated with higher unemployment and, as a result, a heightened risk of violence and political instability. For some, the transition to more mature age structures is almost a sine qua non for democratization.

Population aging
Population aging presents the obverse effect: older populations are less risk-taking and less prone to violence and instability. However, like those under-16, they place great strain on the social safety net, especially in countries committed to old-age provision and high-quality medical care. 

Some observers believe that the advent of a much older planet, courtesy of below-replacement fertility in Europe, North America, China and much of the rest of Asia and Latin America, will produce a 'geriatric peace'.  Others are concerned that population aging will bankrupt the welfare state and handicap western liberal democracies' ability to project power abroad to defend their interests. A more cautious climate could also herald slower economic growth, less entrepreneurship and reduced productivity in mature democracies. 

However, some argue that older people in the developed world have much higher productivity, human capital and better health than their counterparts in developing countries, so the economic effects of population aging will be largely mitigated.

Other branches of political demography
Other areas in political demography address the political impact of skewed sex ratios (typically caused by female infanticide or neglect), urbanization, global migration, and the links between population, environment and conflict

Emerging discipline
The study of political demography is in its early stages and can be traced back to the works of figures such as Jack Goldstone, whom is often considered to be the father of Political Demography. Since 2000 the subject has drawn the attention of policymakers and journalists and is now emerging as an academic subfield. Panels on political demography appear at demography conferences such as the Population Association of America (PAA) and European Association for Population Studies (EAPS). There is now a political demography section at the International Studies Association. A number of important international conferences have also taken place since 2006 on the subject.

See also
 Natalism
 Religious demography
 Quiverfull
 Jack Goldstone
 Philip Longman
 Myron Weiner
 Ben Wattenberg
World population
Demographic engineering

References

External links
The Political Demography of Ethnicity, Nationalism and Religion Eric Kaufmann's website 
 Webcast of book launch of Political Demography, at Woodrow Wilson Center, Jan. 10, 2012 - featuring Jack Goldstone, Eric Kaufmann, Mark Haas, Elizabeth Leahy, and chaired by Geoff Dabelko
Demography and Security: The Politics of Population Change, conference at Weatherhead Center, Harvard University, May 7-8, 2009 
International Studies Association, Political Demography Section
Shall the Religious Inherit the Earth?: Religiosity, Fertility and Politics
Ruy Teixeira US political demographics website
William Frey US political demographics site

Politics
Demography
Population